Pardon My Gun is a 1930 American Pre-Code Western film directed by Robert De Lacey, starring Sally Starr and Tom Keene (as George Duryea).  This was the last time Keene worked under his real name, George Duryea.

Cast
Sally Starr as Mary Martin
Tom Keene as Ted Duncan
Mona Ray as Peggy Martin
Lee Moran as Jeff Potter
Robert Edeson as Pa Martin
Hank MacFarlane as Hank Martin
Tom MacFarlane as Tom Martin
Harry Woods as Cooper

Soundtrack
 "Deep Down South" (Music by George Green, lyrics by Monte Collins)

External links

1930 films
1930s Western (genre) comedy films
American black-and-white films
American Western (genre) comedy films
Pathé Exchange films
Films directed by Robert De Lacey
1930 comedy films
1930s English-language films
1930s American films